San Emiliano is a municipality located in the province of León, Castile and León, Spain. At the 2011 census (INE), the municipality has a population of 706 inhabitants. The municipality is a known for tourism as for their small county state in Spain.

Language
The local dialect is known as Paḷḷuezu, a variant of the Leonese dialect used in the northern part of the province.

References

Municipalities in the Province of León